Garrawilla National Park was created in December 2005. It covers an area of 937 hectares. This park is located on the northern side of the Oxley Highway approximately halfway between Coonabarabran and Mullaley in New South Wales, Australia.

See also
 Protected areas of New South Wales

References

National parks of New South Wales
Protected areas established in 2005
2005 establishments in Australia